Sergey Matviyenko (born 3 June 1972) is a Kazakhstani wrestler. He competed at the 1996 Summer Olympics and the 2000 Summer Olympics.

References

External links
 

1972 births
Living people
Kazakhstani male sport wrestlers
Olympic wrestlers of Kazakhstan
Wrestlers at the 1996 Summer Olympics
Wrestlers at the 2000 Summer Olympics
Place of birth missing (living people)
Asian Games medalists in wrestling
Asian Games gold medalists for Kazakhstan
Medalists at the 1998 Asian Games
Wrestlers at the 1998 Asian Games
21st-century Kazakhstani people
20th-century Kazakhstani people